Greatest Hits is the first of Sublime's compilation albums released after frontman Bradley Nowell's death. It was released in 1999.

The enhanced CD contained two music videos: "What I Got" and "Wrong Way".

Track listing

Charts

References

1999 greatest hits albums
Sublime (band) albums
Albums produced by David Kahne
Albums produced by Paul Leary
MCA Records compilation albums
Compilation albums published posthumously